District 105 may refer to:
 Pennsylvania House of Representatives, District 105
 Pontiac William Holliday School District 105 
 LaGrange School District 105